The year 1925 was the 143rd year of the Rattanakosin Kingdom of Siam (now known as Thailand). It was the sixteenth and last year in the reign of King Vajiravudh (Rama VI) and first year in the reign of King Prajadhipok (Rama VII), and is reckoned as years 2467 (1 January – 31 March) and 2468 (1 April – 31 December) in the Buddhist Era.

Incumbents
 Monarch: Vajiravudh (Rama VI) (until 26 November), Prajadhipok (Rama VII)
 Supreme Patriarch: Jinavorn Sirivaddhana

Events
 26 November – King Vajiravudh dies at the age of 44. He was succeeded by his younger brother and King Chulalongkorn's youngest son Prince Prajadhipok Sakdidej, the Prince of Sukhothai, who became Rama VII.

Births
 20 September - Prince Ananda Mahidol was born in Heidelberg, Germany.
 24 November - Princess Bejaratana was born at the Grand Palace, Bangkok.

Deaths
 26 November - King Vajiravudh died at the Grand Palace, Bangkok.

References

 
1920s in Siam
Years of the 20th century in Thailand
Siam
Siam